Emerson César dos Santos (born 29 July 1980), known as Nhanhá, is a Brazilian football (soccer) striker.

Career

References

Living people
1989 births
Brazilian footballers
Brazilian expatriate footballers
Club Universidad Nacional footballers
Expatriate footballers in Mexico
Association football forwards
Footballers from São Paulo (state)